Sir James McDonald  is a British engineer and educator, serving as Principal and vice-chancellor of the University of Strathclyde since 2009. He is the current President of the Royal Academy of Engineering and is also a visiting professor at NYU Tandon School of Engineering.
 
After seven years of work within the UK Electricity Supply Industry, McDonald joined Strathclyde University in 1984 and became Professor of Electrical Power Systems in 1993. In 2001 he was invited to deliver the MacMillan Memorial Lecture to the Institution of Engineers and Shipbuilders in Scotland. He chose the subject "Electric Propulsion in Marine Applications: An Electrical Engineer's Viewpoint". In 2006, he was appointed Deputy Principal responsible for Research. McDonald is a Fellow of the Institution of Engineering and Technology and of the Institute of Physics. He has co-authored over 600 papers and three books. 

He was knighted in the 2012 Birthday Honours for services to education, engineering and the economy.

On 15 February 2019, the Royal Academy of Engineering announced that its Trustee Board had nominated Professor McDonald as its presidential candidate for election by Fellows at the September 2019 AGM. Following his election, McDonald will serve a term of five years and has become the Academy's first Scottish President.

On 2 October 2021, McDonald delivered his first TEDx Talk at the Resilience Reignited 2021 TEDxUniversityofStrathclyde Annual Ideas Conference.

McDonald delivered an inspiring and motivational TEDx talk at the 2021 Annual Ideas Conference organised by TEDxUniversity of Strathclyde under the theme "Resilience Reignited". The timing of the conference and the deliverance of Sir Jim McDonald's TED talk were especially fitting as they took place shortly before COP26 - the United Nations Climate Change' Conference which saw policymakers from across the globe come together in Glasgow to collectively brainstorm and share ideas on how to effectively address climate change.

During his TED talk, McDonald discussed a systems engineering approach to achieving net zero by 2050 which includes the use of steam reforming. "Net Zero" means not adding to the amount of greenhouse gases in the atmosphere - achieving this means reducing emissions as much as possible as well as balancing out those that remain by an equivalent amount 

He highlighted the factors in energy which need to be taken in consideration if we are to achieve a decarbonised future - factors such as affordability, reliability, economic opportunity and public engagement. He spoke about the importance of leadership, policy making and resilient infrastructure in the goal towards creating a sustainable future.

References

Living people
Knights Bachelor
Presidents of the Royal Academy of Engineering
Fellows of the Royal Academy of Engineering
Fellows of the Royal Society of Edinburgh
People associated with the University of Strathclyde
Polytechnic Institute of New York University faculty
Fellows of the Institute of Physics
British electrical engineers
1957 births